The Irish Steam Preservation Society is a voluntary organisation based in Stradbally, Co Laois whose aim is to preserve and maintain machinery connected to Ireland's industrial and social heritage. The society is responsible for the Irish National Steam Rally. Additionally, it curates the Stradbally Steam Museum and runs the traditional Irish  narrow gauge Stradbally Woodland Railway.

History
The Irish Steam Preservation Society was formed by a group of Laois based enthusiasts who set out to preserve for the good of the country, a part of our national agricultural heritage, the steam traction engine and its many forms after a meeting of half a dozen members at Harold Condell’s farm in Whitefields Co. Laois in 1964. They visited the Lowton Park rally in Lancashire England to see how a rally was run in the summer of 1965. A small gathering of engines was held at the market house in Stradbally on St Stephen's day 1965 and thus with this being regarded as a success it was decided upon by the newly formed society to hold a larger rally in the grounds of Stradbally hall on the August Bank holiday weekend the following year.

National Steam Rally
The National Steam Rally began as a simple arena with engines taking part in various competitions such as a slow race, lining up to the threshing mill competitions and winching displays. Other attractions at the rally soon came about, notable was the addition of the steam railway in 1967 of a simple track laid out and a locomotive kindly donated by the Guinness Brewery was run with its passenger carriage in tow. In 1969 tracks were laid to run the preserved Bórd na Móna locomotive No.2. With this addition the National Steam Rally at Stradbally remains as the only rally in Ireland to have a steam railway.

The National Steam Rally has grown and for its 50th year gathered the most steam engines ever on the island of Ireland for that special anniversary year. With this prominence other heritage focused groups such as the Celtic steamers have used the National rally as a place to end their ‘road runs’ which they use to raise money for various charities around the country. The rally has grown again in recent years to establish itself as the premier event in the Irish Steam rally calendar and has gained international recognition with visitors travelling from as far as Germany to experience it.

Stradbally Woodland Railway
The Stradbally Woodland Railway was the first volunteer-run heritage railway in Ireland, having been established in 1969. We've been running regular steam services every Bank Holiday weekend and selected other running days during the year ever since. The railway operates from a station through the woods, returning via a balloon loop. This line is home to former Bord na Móna steam locomotive No. 2 (later No. LM44)  "Roisín" which had been built by Andrew Barclay Sons & Co. (2264 of 1949).

Museum
In June 1968 the “Steam Museum” was opened in Stradbally by P.J Lalor, parliamentary secretary to the Minister of Transport and Power. It has grown from its humble beginnings to the fine building it is today housing many fine exhibits and engines for the public to see. It is open by arrangement with the societies secretary.

See also
List of steam fairs
Railway Preservation Society of Ireland

Notes

External links
Official website of the Irish Steam Preservation Society
Official Website of the Stradbally Woodland Railway

Steam festivals
Engineering preservation societies